UNB may refer to:
 Barrientista National Union, a political party in Bolivia
 National University of Benin
 Unnilbium (Unb), a chemical element now known as Nobelium
 Union National Bank a bank in the United Arab Emirates
 United News of Bangladesh
 University of Brasília
 University of New Brunswick
 Ultra Narrow Band, a network technology
 UNB (group), a South Korean boy band consisting of winners from The Unit: Idol Rebooting Project